San José de Ocoa, or simply Ocoa, is the capital of San José de Ocoa province in the Dominican Republic. It is located in a valley in the southern region of the Central Cordillera mountain range.

History

The town was founded in 1805 by people from the southern town of Baní. The Spanish Canarian descendants were the first ethnic group to settle in San José de Ocoa, remaining a significant minority in the town. Other families from Spain, Italy and France would soon follow. Blacks also would later settle in San José de Ocoa, most of them being Afro-Caribbean Cocolo descendants arriving from San Pedro de Macoris. 

In December 1858, San José de Ocoa was elevated to the category of municipality in the former province of Santo Domingo; in 1895, it was transferred to the province of Azua. In 1944 when the province of Peravia was created, San José de Ocoa became a municipality of this province. Finally, the town became the capital municipality of the new province of San José de Ocoa on 6 September 2000.

Geography
It lies on the banks of the Ocoa River river in the sub-region of Valdesia.

Climate

Economy

Agriculture is the dominant sector in the economy of the municipality. The main crops are coffee, beans and potatoes. Other vegetables, such as cabbage and carrot are also grown as well as some tropical fruits (avocado and mango). Other economic activities are trade, carpentry workshops, mechanical and some processing of agricultural products.

Prominent residents of the city
 Rafael Sanchez, better known by the alias of Jack Veneno, former professional wrestler and current sub-secretary of sports, was born in Ocoa.
 Félix Estrella, ex-governor and candidate for senator for the province of San José De Ocoa for the PLD.

See also
 Peravia Province

References

Populated places in San José de Ocoa Province
Municipalities of the Dominican Republic